Sukhpar is a Census town situated in Kachchh district of Gujarat, India.

Demographics
Sukhpar consist of total population of 13,303 people. The town has a literacy rate of 81.72 percent, higher than the Gujarat state's average literacy rate of 78.03 percent.

References

Cities and towns in Kutch district